Hubei station is a station of Shenzhen Metro Line 2. It opened on 28 June 2011.

Station layout

Exits

References

External links
 Shenzhen Metro Hubei Station (Chinese)
 Shenzhen Metro Hubei Station (English

Shenzhen Metro stations
Railway stations in Guangdong
Luohu District
Railway stations in China opened in 2011